

LIPNUR developed and manufactured the Super Kunang - also known as the Super Kunang 35 - in the 1960s. Powered by a Volkswagen air-cooled engine and seating only one person, it was used as a light sports plane.

Kunang-Kunang means 'Firefly' in Indonesian.

Development
The prototype Super Kunang I (X-05) first flew on 25 October 1963. In production, it was known as the Super Kunang 35.
Both the prototype and a 2-seat variant (see below) were exhibited at the National Research Exhibition in Jakarta (1-13 July 1965).

Variants
A two-seat prototype, the Super Kunang II (X-07), was flown on 15 January 1965 but doesn't seem to have gone into production.

Specifications
from

References

See also

Indonesian sport aircraft
Aircraft first flown in 1963